Charles Darwin volcanic field is a submarine volcanic field in the Cape Verde islands. 

It lies southwest of Santo Antao island at  depth. Other vents are known as Tabanka, Batuku, Mandora, De Saude and Koladera. Vents in the Charles Darwin volcanic field include cones with pahoehoe, pillow lavas, scoria and have erupted basalts with xenoliths. Unusually for volcanoes at such depths, they show evidence of explosive eruptions. Volcanic rocks appear to be 1,000s or 10,000s of years old and there is no evidence of Holocene activity but the volcanic field was active in recent times and seismic swarms have been recorded.

Corals and sponges grow on the volcanoes. Bioluminescent gorgonians have been sampled at the Charles Darwin volcanic field.

References

Sources 

 

Volcanic fields
Volcanoes of Cape Verde